The 2018 Overwatch World Cup was an Overwatch esports tournament, organized by Blizzard Entertainment, the game's developer. It was the third Overwatch World Cup. It featured 24 represented nations from around the world, with the final tournament taking place at the Anaheim Convention Center during BlizzCon from November 2–3, 2018.

The final took place on November 2 between South Korea and China. South Korea won 4–0, winning their third straight World Cup title.

Teams

Committees 
Each country has a National Competition Committee, consisting of a general manager, head coach, and community lead. Blizzard selected each team's general manager, while the head coach and community leads were selected through a two-step voting process, that took place from May 24 to May 30.

Any player with a Blizzard account in good standing was welcome to apply for a head coaching position for their country; the country's top 150 players voted for who they would like to be their country's head coach. The top three candidates from the first round of voting moved on to a second round of voting, and the person with the most votes in the second round was selected as the country's head coach.

The community leaders are responsible for "rallying their community and marketing their team to the masses." Like the head coaches, the community lead for each country was chosen through a two-step voting process. A country's entire player base voted for the community lead. After the first round of voting, the top 10 from that round were candidates for the second round; the person with the most votes in the second round was selected as their country's community lead.

Players 
They players representing each country were selected by their National Competition Committee. The Committees selected up to 12 players from June 1 to July 5 to represent their country and then had to cut it down to 7 players to be their final roster.

Qualification 
From March 28 to April 28, 2018, Blizzard tracked the average skill rating of the top 150 players from the top 20 countries to determine the countries who qualified for the tournament. The four host countries, South Korea, Thailand, France, and the United States, automatically qualified.

Automatically qualified as Hosts (4)

Qualified by skill rating (20)

Venues

Group stage 
The top 24 national teams were grouped into four different round-robin style groups, with the matches played in Incheon, Los Angeles, Bangkok, and Paris. The top two teams in each group advanced to a single-elimination playoff bracket, with the matches played in Anaheim.

Incheon stage 

Source: OWWC

Los Angeles stage 

Source: OWWC

Bangkok stage 

Source: OWWC

Paris stage 

Source: OWWC

Knockout stage 
The top two teams from each group advanced to the playoff bracket. All of the playoff rounds took place at the Anaheim Convention Center in Anaheim, California during BlizzCon.

To coincide with the event, Blizzard launched the "Overwatch World Cup Viewer," a standalone program that allows users to view World Cup matches in real time in Overwatch's spectator mode, roam around the map in a free camera, and take the perspectives of the players. Users were also able to view replays of each map played in the client.

Bracket

Quarterfinals

Semifinals

Third place

Finals

References

External links 
 Official website

Overwatch
Overwatch World Cup
Overwatch
Overwatch